Dolní Cerekev is a market town in Jihlava District in the Vysočina Region of the Czech Republic. It has about 1,300 inhabitants.

Administrative parts
Villages of Nový Svět and Spělov are administrative parts of Dolní Cerekev.

References

Populated places in Jihlava District
Market towns in the Czech Republic